Current affairs is a genre of broadcast journalism in which major news stories are discussed at length in a timely manner.

This differs from regular news broadcasts that place emphasis on news reports presented for simple presentation as soon as possible, often with a minimum of analysis. It is also different from the news magazine show format in that the events are discussed immediately.

The UK's BBC programmes such as This World, Panorama, Real Story, BBC Scotland Investigates, Spotlight, Week In Week Out, and Inside Out fit the definition.

In Canada, CBC Radio produces a number of current affairs show both nationally such as The Current and As It Happens as well as regionally with morning current affairs shows such as Information Morning, a focus the radio network developed in the 1970s as a way to recapture audience from television.

Additionally, newspapers such as the Private Eye, The Economist, Monocle, The Spectator, The Week, The Oldie, Investors Chronicle, Prospect, MoneyWeek, New Statesman, Time, Fortune, BBC History Magazine, and History Today are all sometimes referred to as current affairs magazines.

References

Broadcast journalism